Tsikul is a rural locality (a selo) in Krasnooktyabrskoye Rural Settlement, Gus-Khrustalny District, Vladimir Oblast, Russia. The population was 57 as of 2010.

Geography 
Tsikul is located 43 km southeast of Gus-Khrustalny (the district's administrative centre) by road. Baranovo is the nearest rural locality.

References 

Rural localities in Gus-Khrustalny District
Melenkovsky Uyezd